Reynolds Station is an unincorporated community in Ohio County, Kentucky, United States. Reynolds Station has a post office with ZIP code 42368, which opened on April 22, 1890.

References

Unincorporated communities in Ohio County, Kentucky
Unincorporated communities in Kentucky